Provincial elections were held in Slovak Province on 2 December 1928. The elections were marked by a drop in support for the Slovak People's Party, whilst the Republican Party of Farmers and Peasants emerged as the largest party in the Assembly of Slovakia.

Background
The Slovak Assembly was established on 14 July 1927 when the National Assembly abolished the counties of Czechoslovakia, replacing them with four provinces, one of which was Slovakia. The law took effect on 1 July 1928.

Electoral system
The 54-member Assembly had two-thirds of its members elected and the other third appointed by the national government.

Results

References

Slovakia
Elections in Slovakia
Legislative elections in Czechoslovakia
Slovakia
Election and referendum articles with incomplete results